The Immediate Geographic Region of Ubá is one of the 10 immediate geographic regions in the Intermediate Geographic Region of Juiz de Fora, one of the 70 immediate geographic regions in the Brazilian state of Minas Gerais and one of the 509 of Brazil, created by the National Institute of Geography and Statistics (IBGE) in 2017.

Municipalities 
It comprises 17 municipalities.

 Brás Pires      
 Divinésia    
 Dores do Turvo   
 Guarani      
 Guidoval     
 Guiricema     
 Mercês     
 Piraúba    
 Rio Pomba      
 Rodeiro     
 São Geraldo      
 Senador Firmino    
 Silveirânia     
 Tabuleiro     
 Tocantins
 Ubá     
 Visconde do Rio Branco

References 

Geography of Minas Gerais